

Life and career 

Régent Millette (September 14, 1935 – August 21, 2013) was a perennial candidate for public office, having run in twenty-five federal, provincial, and municipal elections since 2000. In 2013, he declared "I will run for office until I die". He was a candidate of the Parti démocratie chrétienne du Québec in the 2003 provincial election but has run as an independent in every other campaign. He was a member of the short-lived Parti république du Québec in 2007 but never actually ran under its banner.

Millette has a teaching certificate and a Bachelor of Arts degree from the Université de Montréal and has worked as a teacher. During the 2005 municipal election, he said that he felt a calling to serve the public and would take no salary if elected. He holds socially conservative views; during the 2003 Montreal gay pride parade, he was quoted as saying, "I love everybody but in the Bible they say there are many things that are against nature."

Political activism 

A candidate named Régent Millette ran for the Ralliement national in the 1966 Quebec election and received 96 votes (0.46%) for a fifth-place finish against incumbent Liberal cabinet minister Paul Gérin-Lajoie. This may have been the same person.

Millette is running again in the 2011 Canadian federal election.

In March 2006, Mr. Millette was charged with attempting to file a breach of condition and conspiring to file a breach of condition when, at a meeting of Laval city council , he asked questions on behalf of Rick Blatter while the latter had undertaken to respect a court order prohibiting him from communicating with the staff of the town hall and the elected officials of Laval. Following his acquittal, Mr Millette tried to get an indemnity of $95,000 from Ville Laval but lost his cause in 2012. In 2013 the Supreme Court of Canada rejected his request for appeal.

Death 

Mr Millette, aged 77 years old, passed away on August 21, 2013 at the Joliette Regional Hospital in Saint-Charles-Borromée.

References

1935 births
2013 deaths